Salvia hierosolymitana is a species of flowering plant in the family Lamiaceae. It is a herbaceous perennial commonly called Jerusalem salvia or Jerusalem sage that is native to the eastern Mediterranean, with populations in Cyprus, Israel, Jordan, Lebanon, Syria, and the West Bank. It typically grows in open fields, rocky soils, and among low-growing native shrubs. It was first described in 1853 by botanist Pierre Edmond Boissier, with the epithet "hierosolymitana" referring to "royal, sacred Jerusalem".

It forms a mound of  basal leaves that spreads to 2 ft, and slightly less in height. The ovate mid-green leaves are evergreen, lightly covered with hairs, and with a scalloped margin, growing 8–10 in long with prominent veining underneath. The 1 in or smaller flowers are a wine-red color, growing in widely spaced whorls, with 2-6 flowers per whorl. The lower lip is white, with wine-red spotting. The calyces are pea-green with red veins and bracts edged in red. The square stem of the 1 ft long inflorescences are also edged in red. Unlike many salvias, there is no odor when the leaves are crushed, and there is no known medicinal use of this plant.

In Israeli cuisine, the leaves are being stuffed with meat and rice then cooked with lamb riblets.

References

External links
 UBC Botanical Garden page

hierosolymitana
Taxa named by Pierre Edmond Boissier